Lluís Claret (born 1951 in Andorra la Vella) is an Andorran cellist. He was born in Andorra in 1951 where he began his musical education at the age of 9. In 1964 he moved to Barcelona, won major distinctions at the Conservatory of the Liceu, and began working with Enric Casals. Claret continued his studies in France, Italy and in the USA. Throughout his career he has been especially committed to chamber music.

He has performed with many noted orchestras including National Symphony de Washington, Moscow Philharmonic, National Orchestra of France, English Chamber Orchestra, Hungarian Philharmonic, Czech Philharmonic.

He won first prizes at a number of prestigious international competitions. He is a founding member of the Trio de Barcelona and frequently collaborates with well-known musicians. He teaches at music schools and conservatories and he also regularly participates in the juries of major international competitions.

References

External links

Lluís Claret on the Internet Movie Database

1951 births
Living people
Music educators
Andorran classical cellists
People from Andorra la Vella
Andorran emigrants to Spain